Holy Name University College of Law or HNU-COL is a department of the Holy Name University, formerly Divine Word College of Tagbilaran (DWC-T), an institution of higher learning, located in Tagbilaran, Bohol, Philippines. The College offers a Baccalaureate course leading to the degree of Bachelor of Laws or LLB. The degree is preparatory to taking the Philippine Bar Examination every September.

Its Law course is under the supervision of the Supreme Court of the Philippines and the Commission on Higher Education (Philippines) (CHED). It is also a member of the Philippine Association of Law Schools (PALS).

Milestones 
The HNU College of Law garnered another golden harvest or milestone as nine (9) graduates passed the 2011 Bar Examinations. Eight (8) of twelve (12) or 66.67% of its May 2011 graduates hurdled the said exam, the University's highest passing percentage in the Bar Exams in recent years. The new lawyers will take their Oath on March 21, 2012 at the Philippine International Convention Center in Pasay, Metro Manila.

People

Administration 
 Dean: Dean Tomas D. Abapo, Jr.
 Secretary: Ms. Mary Joyce M. Gonzales

Faculty

Notable alumni 
 Edgar Migrino Chatto—Governor of Bohol
 Roberto C. Cajes—former Congressman
 Eladio Manliguez Jala—SEC Commissioner

References

External links 
Holy Name University

Private universities and colleges in the Philippines
Educational institutions established in 1946
Catholic universities and colleges in the Philippines
Law schools in the Philippines
1946 establishments in the Philippines